The Baroda Museum & Picture Gallery in Vadodara was built in 1894 on the lines of the Victoria & Albert Museum and the Science Museum of London. Major Mant in association with R.F. Chisholm  who refined some of Mant's finest works to make genuine Indo-Saracenic architecture designed the Building of this Museum.

Maharaja Sayajirao Gaekwad III belonging to the Gaekwad dynasty of the Marathas founded the museum in 1887. The museum building was completed in 1894, when it opened to the public. Construction of the art gallery commenced in 1908, was completed in 1914, but did not open until 1921 as the First World War delayed transfer of pieces from Europe intended for the gallery.

Collection 
It preserves a rich collection of art, sculpture, ethnography and ethnology. The picture gallery offers a collection of originals by famous British painters J. M. W. Turner and John Constable and many others. The Egyptian mummy and skeleton of a baby blue whale are major attractions for those who visit the museum. Other treasure includes the famous Akota bronzes dating to the fifth century AD, a collection of Mughal miniatures, a full-fledged gallery of Tibetan Art and oils by several European masters.

Timings
The museum is open on all days from 10:30 am till 5:00 pm except government holidays.

See also
 Akota Bronzes

References

External links

Tourist attractions in Vadodara
Art museums and galleries in India
Museums in Gujarat
Baroda State
Art museums established in 1894
1894 establishments in India
Archaeological museums in India